The 2007 Heartland Championship was the primary provincial rugby union championship in New Zealand played between August 18 and October 18, 2007. As in the inaugural competition, the 2006 Heartland Championship, 12 teams were involved. 

North Otago won the Meads Cup, beating Whanganui in the final, while Poverty Bay repeated as Lochore Cup champions, overcoming a half-time deficit of 16 points to beat South Canterbury.

Round 1

Standings

The top three places in each pool, highlighted in gray, advanced to the Meads Cup. The remaining teams entered the Lochore Cup.

Pool A 
{| class="wikitable"
|-border=1 cellpadding=5 cellspacing=0
! bgcolor="#efefef" width="20"|Pos
! bgcolor="#efefef" width="185"|Name
! bgcolor="#efefef" width="20"|Pld
! bgcolor="#efefef" width="20"|W
! bgcolor="#efefef" width="20"|D
! bgcolor="#efefef" width="20"|L
! bgcolor="#efefef" width="20"|F
! bgcolor="#efefef" width="20"|A
! bgcolor="#efefef" width="20"|+/-
! bgcolor="#efefef" width="20"|BP
! bgcolor="#efefef" width="20"|Pts
|- align=center bgcolor="#c0c0c0"
|align=left|1
|align="left"|Mid Canterbury
|5||3||0||2||122||92||+30||3||15
|- align=center bgcolor="#c0c0c0"
|align=left|2
|align="left"|Wairarapa Bush
|5||3||0||2||140||67||+73||3||15
|- align=center bgcolor="#c0c0c0"
|align=left|3
|align="left"|King Country
|5||3||0||2||88||66||+22||2||14
|- align=center
|align=left|4
|align="left"|West Coast
|5||3||0||2||91||114||-23||1||13
|- align=center
|align=left|5
|align="left"|Thames Valley
|5||2||0||3||89||118||-29||2||10
|- align=center
|align=left|6
|align="left"|Horowhenua-Kapiti
|5||1||0||4||91||164||-73||0||4
|}

Pool B 
{| class="wikitable"
|-border=1 cellpadding=5 cellspacing=0
! bgcolor="#efefef" width="20"|Pos
! bgcolor="#efefef" width="185"|Name
! bgcolor="#efefef" width="20"|Pld
! bgcolor="#efefef" width="20"|W
! bgcolor="#efefef" width="20"|D
! bgcolor="#efefef" width="20"|L
! bgcolor="#efefef" width="20"|F
! bgcolor="#efefef" width="20"|A
! bgcolor="#efefef" width="20"|+/-
! bgcolor="#efefef" width="20"|BP
! bgcolor="#efefef" width="20"|Pts
|- align=center bgcolor="#c0c0c0"
|align=left|1
|align="left"|North Otago
|5||5||0||0||185||59||+126||3||23
|- align=center bgcolor="#c0c0c0"
|align=left|2
|align="left"|Buller
|5||4||0||1||112||104||+8||1||17
|- align=center bgcolor="#c0c0c0"
|align=left|3
|align="left"|Wanganui
|5||3||0||2||111||86||+25||3||15
|- align=center
|align=left|4
|align="left"|Poverty Bay
|5||2||0||3||101||99||+2||2||10
|- align=center
|align=left|5
|align="left"|South Canterbury
|5||1||0||4||49||105||-56||1||5
|- align=center
|align=left|6
|align="left"|East Coast
|5||0||0||5||41||146||-105||1||1
|}

Week 1

|- bgcolor="#CCCCFF"
| Pool
| Date
| Time
| Home team
| Score
| Away team
| Score
|- bgcolor="#FFFFFF" 
| A
| August 18
| 14:30
| Mid Canterbury
| 7
| Thames Valley
| 13
|- bgcolor="#FFFFFF" 
| A
| August 18
| 14:30
| Horowhenua-Kapiti
| 13
| King Country
| 34
|- bgcolor="#FFFFFF" 
| A
| August 18
| 14:30
| Wairarapa Bush
| 46
| West Coast
| 0
|- bgcolor="#FFFFFF" 
| B
| August 18
| 14:30
| North Otago
| 51
| Buller
| 20
|- bgcolor="#FFFFFF" 
| B
| August 18
| 14:30
| South Canterbury
| 7
| Poverty Bay
| 24
|- bgcolor="#FFFFFF" 
| B
| August 18
| 14:30
| Wanganui
| 28
| East Coast
| 0
|}

Week 2

|- bgcolor="#CCCCFF"
| Pool
| Date
| Time
| Home team
| Score
| Away team
| Score
|- bgcolor="#FFFFFF" 
| A
| August 25
| 14:30
| Thames Valley
| 5
| Wairarapa Bush
| 41
|- bgcolor="#FFFFFF" 
| A
| August 25
| 14:30
| King Country
| 22
| Mid Canterbury
| 14
|- bgcolor="#FFFFFF" 
| A
| August 25
| 14:30
| Horowhenua-Kapiti
| 17
| West Coast
| 31
|- bgcolor="#FFFFFF" 
| B
| August 25
| 14:30
| Wanganui
| 15
| Buller
| 19
|- bgcolor="#FFFFFF" 
| B
| August 25
| 14:30
| South Canterbury
| 9
| East Coast
| 5
|- bgcolor="#FFFFFF" 
| B
| August 25
| 14:30
| Poverty Bay
| 11
| North Otago
| 31
|}

Week 3

|- bgcolor="#CCCCFF"
| Pool
| Date
| Time
| Home team
| Score
| Away team
| Score
|- bgcolor="#FFFFFF" 
| A
| September 1
| 14:30
| West Coast
| 34
| Thames Valley
| 17
|- bgcolor="#FFFFFF" 
| A
| September 1
| 14:30
| Mid Canterbury
| 42
| Horowhenua-Kapiti
| 20
|- bgcolor="#FFFFFF" 
| A
| September 1 
| 14:30
| Wairarapa Bush
| 16
| King Country
| 8
|- bgcolor="#FFFFFF" 
| B
| September 1
| 14:30
| East Coast
| 7
| Buller
| 38
|- bgcolor="#FFFFFF" 
| B
| September 1
| 14:30
| North Otago
| 26
| South Canterbury
| 7
|- bgcolor="#FFFFFF" 
| B
| September 1
| 14:30
| Wanganui
| 22
| Poverty Bay
| 20
|}

Week 4

|- bgcolor="#CCCCFF"
| Pool
| Date
| Time
| Home team
| Score
| Away team
| Score
|- bgcolor="#FFFFFF" 
| A
| September 8
| 14:30
| Horowhenua-Kapiti
| 18
| Wairarapa Bush
| 12
|- bgcolor="#FFFFFF" 
| A
| September 8
| 14:30
| King Country
| 13
| Thames Valley
| 9
|- bgcolor="#FFFFFF" 
| A
| September 8
| 14:30
| Mid Canterbury
| 23
| West Coast
| 12
|- bgcolor="#FFFFFF" 
| B
| September 8
| 14:30
| South Canterbury 
| 8
| Wanganui 
| 30
|- bgcolor="#FFFFFF" 
| B
| September 8
| 14:30
| North Otago
| 38
| East Coast
| 5
|- bgcolor="#FFFFFF" 
| B
| September 8
| 14:30
| Poverty Bay 
| 13
| Buller
| 15
|}

Week 5

|- bgcolor="#CCCCFFF"
| Pool
| Date
| Time
| Home team
| Score
| Away team
| Score
|- bgcolor="#FFFFF"
| A
| September 15
| 14:30
| Thames Valley
| 45
| Horowhenua-Kapiti
| 23
|- bgcolor="#FFFFF"
| A
| September 15
| 14:30
| Wairarapa Bush
| 25
| Mid Canterbury
| 36
|- bgcolor="#FFFFF"
| A
| September 15
| 14:30
| West Coast
| 14
| King Country
| 11
|- bgcolor="#FFFFF"
| B
| September 15
| 14:30
| East Coast
| 24
| Poverty Bay
| 33
|- bgcolor="FFFFF"
| B
| September 15
| 14:30
| Buller
| 20
| South Canterbury
| 18
|- bgcolor="FFFFF"
| B
| September 15
| 14:30
| Wanganui
| 16
| North Otago
| 39

Round 2

Standings

Meads Cup Pool
{| class="wikitable"
|-border=1 cellpadding=5 cellspacing=
! bgcolor="#efefef" width="20"|Pos
! bgcolor="#efefef" width="185"|Name
! bgcolor="#efefef" width="20"|Pld
! bgcolor="#efefef" width="20"|W
! bgcolor="#efefef" width"20"|D
! bgcolor="#efefef" width"20"|L
! bgcolor="#efefef" width="20"|F
! bgcolor="#efefef" width="20"|A
! bgcolor="#efefef" width="20"|+/-
! bgcolor="#efefef" width="20"|BP
! bgcolor="#efefef" width="20"|Pts
|- align=center bgcolor="#c0c0c0"
|align=left|1
|align="left"|North Otago
|8||6||0||2||266||104||+162||5||29
|- align=center bgcolor="#c0c0c0"
|align=left|2
|align="left"|Mid Canterbury
|8||6||0||2||213||151||+62||4||28
|- align=center bgcolor="#c0c0c0"
|align=left|3
|align="left"|Wanganui
|8||5||0||3||206||135||+71||6||26
|- align=center bgcolor="#c0c0c0"
|align=left|4
|align="left"|Wairarapa Bush
|8||5||0||3||196||131||+65||3||23
|- align=center
|align=left|5
|align="left"|Buller
|8||5||0||3||171||186||-15||2||22
|- align=center
|align=left|6
|align="left"|King Country
|8||3||0||5||117||178||-61||2||14
|}

Lochore Cup Pool
{| class="wikitable"
|-border=1 cellpadding=5 cellspacing=
! bgcolor="#efefef" width="20"|Pos
! bgcolor="#efefef" width="185"|Name
! bgcolor="#efefef" width="20"|Pld
! bgcolor="#efefef" width="20"|W
! bgcolor="#efefef" width"20"|D
! bgcolor="#efefef" width"20"|L
! bgcolor="#efefef" width="20"|F
! bgcolor="#efefef" width="20"|A
! bgcolor="#efefef" width="20"|+/-
! bgcolor="#efefef" width="20"|BP
! bgcolor="#efefef" width="20"|Pts
|- align=center bgcolor="#c0c0c0"
|align=left|1
|align="left"|Poverty Bay
|8||5||0||3||193||162||+31||4||24
|- align=center bgcolor="#c0c0c0"
|align=left|2
|align="left"|South Canterbury
|8||4||0||4||139||173||-34||3||19
|- align=center bgcolor="#c0c0c0"
|align=left|3
|align="left"|West Coast
|8||4||0||4||155||192||-37||1||17
|- align=center bgcolor="#c0c0c0"
|align=left|4
|align="left"|Thames Valley
|8||2||0||6||147||215||-68||4||12
|- align=center
|align=left|5
|align="left"|East Coast
|8||2||0||6||130||210||-70||3||11
|- align=center
|align=left|6
|align="left"|Horowhenua-Kapiti
|8||1||0||7||164||260||-96||2||6
|}

Fixtures and Results

Week 6

|- bgcolor="#CCCCFF"
| Pool
| Date
| Time
| Home team
| Score
| Away team
| Score
|- bgcolor="#FFFFFF" 
| M
| September 22
| 14:00
| Buller
| 17
| Wairarapa Bush
| 24
|- bgcolor="#FFFFFF" 
| M
| September 22
| 14:30
| Mid Canterbury
| 21
| Wanganui
| 19
|- bgcolor="#FFFFFF" 
| M
| September 22
| 14:30
| North Otago
| 52
| King Country
| 5
|- bgcolor="#FFFFFF" 
| L
| September 22
| 14:30
| West Coast
| 29
| East Coast
| 15
|- bgcolor="#FFFFFF" 
| L
| September 22
| 14:30
| Poverty Bay
| 30
| Horowhenua-Kapiti
| 19
|- bgcolor="#FFFFFF" 
| L
| September 22
| 14:30
| Thames Valley
| 22
| South Canterbury
| 28
|}

Week 7

|- bgcolor="#CCCCFF"
| Pool
| Date
| Time
| Home team
| Score
| Away team
| Score
|- bgcolor="#FFFFFF" 
| M
| September 29
| 14:30
| Mid Canterbury
| 45
| Buller
| 18
|- bgcolor="#FFFFFF" 
| M
| September 29
| 14:30
| King Country
| 11
| Wanganui| 
| 36
|- bgcolor="#FFFFFF" 
| M
| September 29
| 14:30
| Wairarapa Bush
| 15
| North Otago
| 7
|- bgcolor="#FFFFFF" 
| L
| September 29
| 14:30
| East Coast
| 31
| Horowhenua-Kapiti
| 22
|- bgcolor="#FFFFFF" 
| L
| September 29
| 14:30
| Poverty Bay
| 26
| Thames Valley
| 23
|- bgcolor="#FFFFFF" 
| L
| September 29
| 14:30
| South Canterbury
| 27
| West Coast
| 14
|}

Week 8

|- bgcolor="#CCCCFF"
| Pool
| Date
| Time
| Home team
| Score
| Away team
| Score
|- bgcolor="#FFFFFF" 
| M
| October 6
| 14:30
| Buller
| 24
| King Country
| 13
|- bgcolor="#FFFFFF" 
| M
| October 6
| 14:30
| North Otago
| 22
| Mid Canterbury
| 25
|- bgcolor="#FFFFFF" 
| M
| October 6
| 14:30
| Wanganui
| 40
| Wairarapa Bush
| 17
|- bgcolor="#FFFFFF" 
| L
| October 6
| 14:30
| Horowhenua-Kapiti
| 32
| South Canterbury
| 35
|- bgcolor="#FFFFFF" 
| L
| October 6
| 14:30
| Thames Valley
| 13
| East Coast
| 43
|- bgcolor="#FFFFFF" 
| L
| October 6
| 14:30
| West Coast
| 21
| Poverty Bay
| 36
|}

Semifinals

Fixtures and Results

Meads Cup

|- bgcolor="#CCCCFF"
| Date
| Time
| Home team
| Score
| Away team
| Score
|- 
| October 13
| 16:05
| style="background:silver" | North Otago
| style="background:silver" |30 
| Wairarapa Bush
| 13
|- 
| October 13
| 13:35
|  Mid Canterbury
|  0 
|  style="background:silver" | Wanganui
|  style="background:silver" |18

Lochore Cup

|- bgcolor="#CCCCFF"
| Date
| Time
| Home team
| Score
| Away team
| Score
|- 
| October 13
| 14:30
|  style="background:silver" | Poverty Bay
|  style="background:silver" |65 
|  Thames Valley
|  3
|- 
| October 13
| 14:30
|  style="background:silver" | South Canterbury
|  style="background:silver" |31
|  West Coast 
|  23

Finals

Fixtures and Results

Meads Cup

|- bgcolor="#CCCCFF"
| Date
| Time
| Home team
| Score
| Away team
| Score
|- bgcolor="#FFFFFF"
| October 20
| 16:05
| style="background:silver" | North Otago
| style="background:silver" | 25
| Wanganui
| 8

Lochore Cup

|- bgcolor="#CCCCFF"
| Date
| Time
| Home team
| Score
| Away team
| Score
|- bgcolor="#FFFFFF"
| October 20
| 13:35
| style="background:silver" | Poverty Bay
| style="background:silver" | 38
| South Canterbury
| 35

References

External links
Heartland draw and results on Allblacks.com

Heartland Championship
3